Víctor Hugo Cejas (born February 23, 1983 in Lehmann, Santa Fe, Argentina) is an Argentine footballer currently playing for Libertad de Sunchales of the Torneo Argentino A in Argentina.

Teams
  Libertad de Sunchales 2004–2010
  Talleres de Córdoba 2010–2011
  Libertad de Sunchales 2011–2012
  Deportivo San Jorge 2013–2014
  Unión 2014
  Libertad de Sunchales 2021–2022

References
 
 

1983 births
Living people
Sportspeople from Santa Fe Province
Argentine footballers
Association football midfielders
Talleres de Córdoba footballers
Libertad de Sunchales footballers